Albert Tasman Roberts (18 August 1901 – 9 April 1942) was an Australian rules footballer who played with St Kilda and Fitzroy in the Victorian Football League (VFL).		

Originally recruited from Prahran in the Victorian Football Association, he returned to the VFA to play for Yarraville Football Club in 1929. In July 1930 Roberts and a Yarraville team-mate, Peter Hannan, were involved in a car accident, in which Roberts fractured his skull.

In 1940, using his given name, his mother's maiden name and a false date of birth, Roberts enlisted in the 2/22nd Infantry Battalion as Albert Lyons.  In April 1941 his battalion embarked to Rabaul, Territory of New Guinea. He was captured as a prisoner of war during the Battle of Rabaul in January 1942.  In October 1945 he was recorded as having died on 9 April 1942 from inanition cachexia (starvation).

See also
 List of Victorian Football League players who died in active service

Notes

External links 

 Tasman Roberts's playing statistics from The VFA Project
 Boyles Football Photos: Tasman Roberts

1901 births
1942 deaths
Australian rules footballers from Melbourne
St Kilda Football Club players
Fitzroy Football Club players
Prahran Football Club players
Yarraville Football Club players
Australian Army soldiers
Australian military personnel killed in World War II
Australian Army personnel of World War II
Deaths by starvation
People from Albert Park, Victoria
Military personnel from Melbourne